The 2016–17 Oregon Ducks women's basketball team represented the University of Oregon during the 2016–17 NCAA Division I women's basketball season. The Ducks, led by third year head coach Kelly Graves, played their games at the Matthew Knight Arena and were members of the Pac-12 Conference. They finished the season 23–14, 8–10 in Pac-12 play to finish in sixth place. They advanced to the semifinals of the Pac-12 women's tournament where they lost to Stanford. They received an at-large bid to the NCAA women's tournament which was their first trip since 2005. They defeated Temple and upset Duke in the first and second rounds to advance to the sweet sixteen for the first time in school history where they upset Maryland to advance to the elite eight where they lost to Connecticut.

Roster

Schedule

|-
!colspan=9 style="background:#004F27; color:yellow;"| Exhibition

|-
!colspan=9 style="background:#004F27; color:yellow;"| Non-conference regular season

|-
!colspan=9 style="background:#004F27; color:yellow;"| Pac-12 regular season

|-
!colspan=9 style="background:#004F27;"| Pac-12 Women's Tournament

|-
!colspan=9 style="background:#004F27;"| NCAA Women's Tournament

Rankings
2016–17 NCAA Division I women's basketball rankings

See also
2016–17 Oregon Ducks men's basketball team

References

Oregon Ducks women's basketball seasons
Oregon
Oregon
Oregon Ducks
Oregon Ducks